Calzada de Don Diego is a village and municipality in the province of Salamanca,  western Spain, part of the autonomous community of Castile and León. The postal code is 37448.

References

Municipalities in the Province of Salamanca